Štefan is a Slavic given name and surname. Notable people with the name include:

Given name
 Štefan Babjak (1931–2008), Slovak classical baritone opera singer
 Štefan Banič (1870–1941), Slovak inventor who patented an early parachute design
 Štefan Čambal (1908–1990), Slovak football player and manager
 Štefan Chrtianský (disambiguation), multiple people
 Štefan Füle (born 1962), Czech diplomat
 Štefan Gerec (born 1992), Slovak football striker
 Štefan Hadalin (born 1995), Slovenian alpine ski racer
 Štefan Harabin (born 1957), Slovak judge and politician
 Štefan Holiš (born 1992), Slovak footballer
 Štefan Horný (born 1957), Slovak football player
 Štefan Jačiansky (1930–1995), Slovak football manager
 Štefan Maixner (born 1968), Slovak football striker
 Štefan Malík (born 1966), Slovak race walker
 Štefan Martiš Slovak fighter ace during World War II
 Štefan Matlák (1934–2003), Slovak footballer
 Štefan Moyses (1797–1869), Slovak bishop
 Štefan Pekár (born 1988), Slovak footballer
 Štefan Planinc (born 1925), Slovene surrealist painter
 Štefan Rosina (born 1987), Slovak racing driver
 Štefan Rusnák (born 1971), Slovak international football forward
 Štefan Ružička (born 1985), Slovak ice hockey player
 Štefan Senecký (born 1980), Slovak football goalkeeper
 Štefan Škaper (born 1966), Slovenian football striker
 Štefan Tarkovič (born 1973), Slovak football manager
 Štefan Tiso (1897–1959), Slovak lawyer and Supreme Court president
 Štefan Žáry (1918–2007), Slovak poet, prosaist, translator and essayist
 Štefan Zaťko (born 1962), Slovak football manager
 Štefan Znám (1936–1993), Slovak-Hungarian mathematician
 Štefan Zošák (born 1984), Slovak football midfielder

Surname
 Anja Štefan (born 1988), Croatian snowboarder
 Anja Štefan (writer), Slovene writer, poet and story teller
 Patrik Štefan (born 1980), Czech ice hockey player

See also
 Stefan
 Stephen

Slovak masculine given names